Popov 1-y is a rural locality (a khutor) in Lysovskoye Rural Settlement, Surovikinsky District, Volgograd Oblast, Russia. The population was 50 as of 2010.

Geography 
Popov 1-y is located on the Liska River, 32 km northeast of Surovikino (the district's administrative centre) by road. Lysov is the nearest rural locality.

References 

Rural localities in Surovikinsky District